Star Hill AME Church, also known as Star of the East Church, is a historic African Methodist Episcopal (AME) church building and cemetery located in Dover, Delaware near Camden, Kent County, Delaware. It was constructed about 1866, and is a one-story, three-bay by three-bay, gable roofed, frame building in a vernacular Gothic Revival-style.  It features a small bell tower at the roof ridge. Interments in the adjacent cemetery are believed to begin with the founding of the church in the 1860s, but the earliest marked grave dates from the early 1890s.

The church is an important focal point of the community of Star Hill, an early community of African American settlement in Kent County.

Star Hill AME Church was founded in the 1860s and is a daughter church of nearby Zion African Methodist Episcopal Church.

It was added to the National Register of Historic Places in 1994.

Today the church is home to the Star Hill Museum, which features exhibits about African American history in Kent County, slavery and the Underground Railroad.

References

External links
 Star Hill Museum

African Methodist Episcopal churches in Delaware
Churches completed in 1866
19th-century Methodist church buildings in the United States
Churches in Kent County, Delaware
Churches on the National Register of Historic Places in Delaware
Museums in Kent County, Delaware
History museums in Delaware
African-American museums in Delaware
1866 establishments in Delaware
National Register of Historic Places in Kent County, Delaware